The Kim family, also known as the Kim dynasty or the Mount Paektu bloodline in the ideological discourse of the Workers' Party of Korea (WPK), is a three-generation lineage of North Korean leadership, descending from the country's founder and first leader, Kim Il-sung. The patriarch came to rule the north in 1948, after the end of Japanese rule split the region in 1945. He began the Korean War in 1950, in a failed attempt to reunify the Korean Peninsula. In the 1980s, Kim Il-sung developed a cult of personality closely tied to the North Korean state philosophy of Juche. Following his death in 1994, Kim Il-sung's role as supreme leader was passed on to his son Kim Jong-il, and then to his grandson Kim Jong-un. All three men have served as leaders of the WPK and have exercised absolute control over North Korea since the state's establishment in 1948.

The North Korean government denies that there is a personality cult surrounding the Kim family, describing the people's devotion to the family as a personal manifestation of support for their nation’s leadership. The Kim family has been described as a de facto absolute monarchy or hereditary dictatorship.

Historical overview

The Kim family has ruled North Korea since 1948 for three generations, and still little about the family is publicly confirmed. Kim Il-sung rebelled against Japanese rule over Korea in the 1930s, which led to his exile in the Soviet Union. Korea was divided after the Japanese surrender in World War II in 1945. Kim came to lead the Provisional People's Committee for North Korea (a Soviet-backed provisional government), becoming the first premier of its new government, the "Democratic People's Republic of Korea" (commonly known as North Korea), in 1948. Hoping to reunify the peninsula, on 25 June 1950 the North Korean KPA crossed the 38th Parallel, sparking the Korean War, which ended in stalemate in 1953.

Kim developed a personality cult over his nearly 46-year leadership which extended to his family, including his mother Kang Pan-sok (known as the "mother of Korea"), his brother Kim Yong-ju ("the revolutionary fighter") and his first wife Kim Jong-suk (the "mother of the revolution"). The strong and absolute leadership of a solitary great leader, known as the Suryong, is central to the North Korean ideology of Juche. Four years after Kim Il-sung's 1994 death, a constitutional change wrote the presidency out of the constitution and named him as Eternal President of the Republic in order to honor his memory forever. Kim Il-sung was known as the Great Leader, and his eldest son and successor, Kim Jong-il, became known as the Dear Leader and later the Great General. Kim Jong-il altogether had over 50 titles.

Kim Jong-il was appointed to the Workers Party's Politburo (and its Presidium), Secretariat and the Central Military Commission at the 6th Workers Party Congress in October 1980, which formalized his role as heir apparent. He led their military beginning in 1990, and had a 14-year grooming period before he became North Korea's ruler. Kim Jong-il had a sister, Kim Kyung-hee, who was North Korea's first female four-star general and married to Jang Song-thaek, who was the second most powerful person in North Korea before his December 2013 execution for corruption. Kim Jong-il had four partners, and at least five children with three of them. His third and youngest son, Kim Jong-un, succeeded him. Scholar Virginie Grzelczyk wrote that the Kim family represented "one of the last bastions of totalitarianism as well as perhaps 'the first Communist Dynasty.

Ancestry 
Kim Il-sung was born in Mangyongdae-guyok to Methodist parents. His father Kim Hyong-jik was 15 when he married Kang Pan-sok two years his elder. Kim Hyong-jik had attended a school founded by Protestant missionaries, which influenced his own family. Kim Hyong-jik became a father at the age of 17, and left school to work as a teacher in a nearby school he once attended. He later practiced Chinese herbal medicine as a doctor. Kim Hyong-jik protested against Japanese rule, and was arrested several times for his activism. He was a founding member of the Korean National Association in 1917, participated in the 1919 March 1st Movement, and fled Korea for Manchuria with his wife and young Kim Il-sung in 1920. There is a teacher's college named after him in Pyongyang.

Kim Hyong-jik's own parents, Kim Bo-hyon and Li Bo-ik, were described as "patriots" by the Editorial Committee of the Short Biography of Kim Il Sung.

Kim Il-sung 

Kim Il-sung married twice and had six children. He met his first wife, Kim Jong-suk, in 1936, marrying her in 1940. She bore sons Kim Jong-il (born 1941 or 1942) and Kim Man-il (born 1944), and daughter Kim Kyong-hui (born 1946) before dying while bearing a stillborn daughter in 1949. Kim Jong-suk was born 24 December 1917 in Hoeryong in (North) Hamgyo’ng Province. Her family and she fled Korea to Yanji, Jilin (Kirin) Province around 1922. In October 1947, Kim Jong-suk presided over the establishment of a school for war orphans in South P’yo’ngan Province, which became the Mangyo’ngdae Revolutionary School. When the school opened in west Pyongyang one year after its foundation, Kim Jong-suk also unveiled the country's first statue to Kim Il-sung. In 1949, Kim Jong-suk was once again pregnant. She continued public activities, but her health diminished. She died on 19 September 1949 due to complications from pregnancy. Kim Il-sung had three children with his second wife, Kim Song-ae: Kim Kyong-il (born 1951), Kim Pyong-il (born 1953), and Kim Yong-il (born 1955). He had two younger brothers, Kim Chol-ju and Kim Yong-ju and a sister.

When Kim Il-sung's first wife died, Kim Song-ae was not recognized as Kim Il-sung's wife for several years. Neither partnerships had public weddings. Born Kim So’ng-p’al in the early 1920s in South P’yongyang Province, Kim Song-ae began her career as a clerical worker in the Ministry of National Defense where she first met Kim Il-sung in 1948. She was hired to work in his residence as an assistant to Kim Jong-suk. In addition to doing secretarial work for the Kims, she also looked after Kim Jong-il and Kim Kyong-hui. After Kim Jong-suk's 1949 death, Kim Song-ae began managing Kim Il-sung's household and domestic life.

In 1953, Kim Song-ae gave birth to her first child with Kim Il-sung, a daughter named Kim Kyong-jin (Kim Kyo’ng-chin). She went on to have at least two other children with him, sons Kim Pyong-il (b. 1954) and Kim Yong-il (b. 1955).

Kim Kyong-hui became North Korea's first female four-star general. Her husband Jang Sung-taek was the second most powerful person in Korea before his December 2013 execution for corruption. Their 29-year-old daughter overdosed on sleeping pills in 2006 while in Paris. It has also been reported that Kim Yong-il, who was dispatched to serve in Germany, died from cirrhosis of the liver in 2000.

Kim Jong-il 

Kim Jong-il had four partners, and at least five children with three of them. He married his first wife, Hong Il-chon, at the behest of Kim Il-sung in 1966. They had one daughter, Kim Hye-kyung (born 1968), before divorcing in 1969. He later fathered Kim Jong-nam (born 1971) with his first consort, film star Song Hye-rim. Due to Song being a divorcee, Kim concealed the relationship and son from his father. In 1974, Kim Jong-il married his second wife, Kim Young-suk. They had two daughters, Kim Sol-song (born 1974) and Kim Chun-song (born 1976). Kim Jong-il divorced her in 1977, after she lost his personal interest. In 1980, Kim Jong-il married his third wife, Ko Yong-hui. Ko was the de facto First Lady of North Korea from Kim Jong-il’s becoming of leader in 1994 until her death in 2004. The couple had two sons, Kim Jong-chul (born 1981) and Kim Jong-un (born 1982 or 1983), and one daughter, Kim Yo-jong (born 1987). After Ko Yong-hui’s death, Kim Jong-il was married to his personal secretary, Kim Ok. The two were married until Kim Jong-il’s death, and did not have any children. The two half-brothers Kim Jong-un and Kim Jong-nam never met, because of the ancient practice of raising potential successors separately. From the early 1980s onward, Kim Jong-il dichotomized the Kim Family between its main, or central, branch (won kaji) and its side, or extraneous, branch (kyot kaji). The main branch referred to Kim Il-sung’s family with Kim Jong-suk and publicly included Kim Jong-il and Kim Kyong-hui. The side branch referred to Kim Il-sung’s family with Kim Sung-ae and included the three children from their marriage.

Kim Jong-un's two older brothers were considered "black sheep" of the family. Kim Jong-nam likely fell out of favor due to advocating for reform in the government. He had a reputation as a troublemaker within the family, and publicly stated in 2011 that North Korea should transition out of his family's rule. On 13 February 2017, Kim Jong-nam was assassinated with the chemical nerve agent VX at Kuala Lumpur International Airport in Malaysia. Two women, one Indonesian and one Vietnamese, smeared the agent on Kim Jong-nam's face; both women were released after it was determined that they had been tricked by North Korean operatives, who had told them that the act was a prank for a Japanese comedy program and that the substance was lotion. Four North Koreans fled Malaysia on the day of the murder. Kim Jong-nam was survived by his wife and six children. His son, Kim Han-sol, has also criticized the regime. In an interview with Finnish media in 2012, Kim Han-sol openly criticized the reclusive regime and the government saying that he has always dreamed that one day he would return to his homeland to "make things better". Ever since the death of his father, his whereabouts have been unknown. It was later revealed in 2019 that Jong-nam was a CIA informant prior to his assassination

The middle son, Kim Jong-chul, was reportedly not considered in succession considerations due to his unmasculine characteristics. He is also known to be reserved.

Kim Jong-un 

Kim Jong-un became North Korea's Supreme Leader on 29 December 2011. He married Ri Sol-ju in either 2009 or 2010, and the couple reportedly had a daughter, Kim Ju-ae, in 2012. His sister Kim Yo-jong had fallen out of favor with her brother for a few years but in 2017, she was elevated by Kim Jong-un to the powerful Central Committee of the Workers' Party of Korea. Kim Jong-un made an effort to distinguish himself from the reputations of his father and brothers, and has promoted the image of an academic who possesses a masculine and extroverted demeanor.

In April 2020, a three-week absence from public view led to speculation that Kim was seriously ill or dead, but no clear evidence of any health problem came to light. He continued to appear in public rarely over the following months, possibly because of health problems or the risk of COVID-19. In August, it was reported that Kim had ceded a degree of authority to his sister, Kim Yo-jong, giving her responsibility for relations with South Korea and the United States and making her his de facto second-in-command.

Possible successors

Kim Ju-ae 
Kim Ju-ae is the daughter of North Korean supreme leader Kim Jong-un and his wife Ri Sol-ju.

Kim Ju-ae appeared in public for the first time at a missile launch in November 2022. She had made five public appearances by early February 2023. State media initially called her Kim Jong-un's "beloved" daughter but soon began using the adjective "respected", which is reserved only for the most honoured members of North Korean society, such as Kim Ju-ae's parents. Some analysts believe that her new public profile is an attempt to present the Kim family in the fashion of a traditional monarchy or a response to rivalries within the North Korean government. It has also led to speculation that she has been chosen as her father's successor, which could make her the first woman to serve as Supreme Leader.

Kim Yo-jong 

Kim Yo-jong, the younger sister of Kim Jong-un, is considered a "rising star" within North Korean politics. She has been groomed since an early age, and has represented North Korea in the 2018 Winter Olympics in South Korea, becoming the first member of the Kim family to visit since the end of the war, and has also played a key role behind the scenes. She met the then-US President Donald Trump in 2018.

Kim Pyong-il 
Kim Pyong-il is the last living son of the country's founder, Kim Il-sung. After losing out to Kim Jong-il, he spent four decades as an ambassador to various European countries, until returning in 2019. He is thought of as having an advantage over Kim Yo-jong due to his gender, but simultaneously carrying a disadvantage due to his lack of connections. He has an adult son, Kim In-kang, and an adult daughter, Kim Ung-song.

Unlikely heirs 
Kim Jong-chul, the older brother of Kim Jong-un, has been described as "lacking in ambition" and to be more interested in Eric Clapton and playing guitars.

Kim Jong-un's reported daughter, Kim Ju-ae, is still a young child, as such, she is considered to be ineligible to succeed her father (but see above). Kim Jong-un is also reported to have two other children born a few years before and after the named girl.

Kim Il-sung's deceased brother, Kim Yong-ju, had two biological and two adopted children, whose identity and current positions within the North Korean government are obscure.

Family tree

See also 

 Paektu Mountain
 List of leaders of North Korea
 North Korean cult of personality
 O family
 Politics of North Korea
 Jeongju Gim (Kim)

References

Citations

Sources

Further reading

External links